Acharian  may refer to:

 Acharian people, an ethnographic group of Georgians
 Hrachia Acharian (1876–1953), Armenian linguist